Anadyr may refer to:
Anadyr (town), a town and the administrative center of Chukotka Autonomous Okrug, Russia
Anadyr District
Anadyr Estuary
Anadyr (river), a river in Chukotka Autonomous Okrug, Russia
Anadyr Highlands
Anadyr Lowlands
Operation Anadyr
Gulf of Anadyr

See also
Anadyrsk, a Cossack fort and settlement on the Anadyr river, approx. 1650-1764